Bob Sall (22 January 1908 Ridgewood, New Jersey – 14 October 1974 Cream Ridge, New Jersey) was an American racecar driver. He made four AAA Championship Car starts from 1934 to 1937 including the 1935 Indianapolis 500 driving in a radical front wheel drive Miller chassis powered by a Ford V8 engine. Sall was primarily a sprint car racer and he later became NASCAR's Eastern field manager.

Career award
Sall was inducted in the National Sprint Car Hall of Fame in 1992.

Indy 500 results

References

1908 births
1974 deaths
Indianapolis 500 drivers
National Sprint Car Hall of Fame inductees
People from Ridgewood, New Jersey
Sportspeople from Bergen County, New Jersey
Racing drivers from New Jersey